The Mithridatic Wars were three conflicts fought by Rome against the Kingdom of Pontus and its allies between 88 BC and 63 BC. They are named after Mithridates VI, the King of Pontus during the course of the wars who initiated the hostilities after annexing the Roman province of Asia into its Pontic Empire (that came to include most of Asia Minor)  and committing massacres against the Roman inhabitants there. Mithridates was able to organise revolts against advancing Roman troops and play off the political factions of the optimates and populares against one another in the Roman civil wars. Nevertheless, the first war ended with a Roman victory, confirmed by the Treaty of Dardanos signed by Sulla and Mithridates. Greece was restored to Roman rule and Pontus was expected to restore the status quo ante bellum in Asia Minor.

As the treaty of Dardanos was barely implemented in Asia Minor, the Roman general Murena (in charge of retaking control of Roman territory in Asia) decided to wage a second war against Pontus. The second war resulted in a Roman defeat and gave momentum to Mithridates, who then forged an alliance with Tigranes the Great, the Armenian King of Kings. Tigranes was the son-in-law of Mithridates and was in control of an Armenian empire that included territories in the Levant. Pontus won the Battle of Chalcedon (74 BC), gave support to Cilician pirates against Roman commerce, and the third war soon began.

For the third war, the Romans sent the consul Lucullus to fight against Armenia and Pontus. Lucullus won the Battle of Cabira and the Battle of Tigranocerta, but this progress was halted following the Battle of Artaxata and the Battle of Zela. Meanwhile, the campaign of Pompey against the Cilician pirates in the Mediterranean was successful and Pompey was named by the Senate to replace Lucullus. Pompey's subsequent campaigns caused the collapse of the Armenian Empire in the Levant (with Roman forces taking control of Syria and Palestine) and the  affirmation of Roman power over Anatolia, Pontus and nearly all the eastern Mediterranean. Tigranes surrendered and became a client king of Rome. Hunted, stripped of his possessions, and in a foreign country, Mithridates had a servant kill him. His former kingdom was combined with one of his hereditary enemies, Bithynia, to form the province of Bithynia and Pontus, which would forestall any future pretender to the throne of Pontus.

Etymology
The bellum Mithridaticum, ("Mithridatic War") referred in official Roman circles to the mandate, or warrant, issued by the Roman Senate in 88 BC declaring war against Mithridates. Handed at first to the consuls, it would not end until the death of Mithridates or the declaration by the Senate that it was at an end. As there were no intermissions in the warrant until the death of Mithridates in 63 BC, there was officially only one Mithridatic War.

Subsequently, historians noticed that the conduct of the war fell into three logical subdivisions. Some of them began to term these subdivisions the "First," "Second," and "Third" in the same texts in which they used the term in the singular. As the Roman Republic faded from general memory, the original legal meaning was not recognized. A few historians folded events prior to the declaration of war into the war.

Today, anything to do with the war can be included under it. Hence, the term "First Mithridatic War" is extended to include the wars between the states of Asia Minor as well as Roman support or lack of it for the parties of these wars. The officers offering this support were acting under other mandates from the Senate; to do anything not mandated was to risk criminal charges at home.

Wars
The wars within the mandate of the bellum Mithridaticum are as follows:

First
The First Mithridatic War (88–85 BC) began with a declaration of war by the Senate. The casus belli was the Asiatic Vespers, although some few claim that war was declared first; that is, that the Vespers were a reaction rather than a cause. Consul Lucius Cornelius Sulla having received the mandate by lot was given several legions fresh from the Social War to implement the mandate.

Aristion, a peripatetic or Epicurean adherent at Athens sent to Mithridates as ambassador, won over by the latter, returned to Athens to convince its citizens to rise in revolt, making him general. Most of Greece followed suit, though not all. Aristion, implementing a new constitution that he believed was based on Aristotle's Politics, conducted a reign of terror on behalf of the redistribution of wealth. The wealthy who could escaped the city to become exiles. Aristion sent an old comrade and known rare document thief, Apellicon of Teos, with a force to recover the Athenian national treasury stored at Delos. It was decisively beaten by the Roman commander, Orobius.

The commanders included Lucius Valerius Flaccus and Gaius Flavius Fimbria. Significant battles included the Battle of Chaeronea and the Battle of Orchomenus in 86 BC. The war ended with a Roman victory, and the Treaty of Dardanos in 85 BC.

Second
Second Mithridatic War (83–81 BC). Roman armies commanded by Lucius Licinius Murena. The war ended inconclusively after a Roman defeat, and withdrawal on Sulla's orders.

Third
Third Mithridatic War (75–63 BC). Roman armies led by Lucius Licinius Lucullus (75–66 BC) then by Pompey (66–63 BC). War ended with Roman victory and the death of Mithridates VI in 63 BC.

Classical references

Diodorus Siculus
Enough remains of Diodorus Siculus to relate a summary of the Mithridatic Wars mixed in with the Civil Wars in the fragments of Books 37-40.

Velleius
A brief summary of the events of the Mithridatic Wars starting with the Asiatic Vespers combined with events of the Civil Wars can be found in Velleius Paterculus, Book II.

Livy
The surviving history closest to the Mithridatic Wars is the History of Rome by Livy (59 BC – 17 AD), which consisted of 142 books written between 27 BC and 9 BC, dated by internal events: he mentions Augustus, who did not receive the title until 27 BC, and the last event mentioned is the death of Drusus, 9 BC. Livy was a close friend of Augustus, to whom he read his work by parts, which means that he had access to records and writings at Rome. He worked mainly in retreat at Naples. Livy was born a few years after the last Mithridatic War, and grew up in the Late Republic. His location at Padua kept him out of the Civil Wars. He went to the big city perhaps to work on his project. Its nature sparked the interest of the emperor immediately (he had eyes and ears everywhere), who made it a point to be Octavian, not Augustus, to the circle of his friends (he often found duty tedious and debilitating). Livy was thus only one generation away from the Mithridatic Wars writing in the most favorable environment under the best of circumstances.

Only 35 of the 142 books survived. Livy used no titles or period names. He or someone close to him wrote summaries, or Periochae,  of the contents of each book. Books 1 – 140 have them. Their survival, no doubt, can be attributed to their use as a “little Livy,” as the whole work proved to be far too long for any copyist. The events of the Mithridatic Wars survive only in the Periochae.

The term “Mithridatic War” appears only once in Livy, in Periocha 100. The Third Mithridatic War was going so badly that the Senators of both parties combined to get the Lex Manilia passed by the Tribal Assembly removing command of the east from Lucullus and others and giving it instead to Pompey. The words of the Periocha are C. Manilius tribunus plebis magna indignatione nobilitatis legem tulit, ut Pompeio Mithridaticum bellum mandaretur, “Gaius Manilius, Tribune of the People, carried the law despite the great indignation of the nobility that the Mithridatic War be mandated to Pompey.” The “nobility” are the Senate, who usually had the privilege of mandates. There is a possible pun on “great,” as Pompey had received the title of “The Great” in the service of Sulla, the original recipient of the mandate. Sulla was deceased; Lucullus held the mandate in his place. This is an intervention by the tribune in the legal business of the Senate. Now it was the indignation that was great.

The “Mithridatic War” is not just a descriptive term of the historians; it is the name of a mandate. As such it began with the declaration of war by the Senate in 88 BC after the Asiatic Vespers (modern term), the casus belli.  Mandates were assigned to the consuls, who, as the name implies, must perform them on penalty for refusal or failure of death. Similarly, only the Senate could declare the termination of a mandate, which is why Livy does not speak of three Mithridatic Wars. Sulla reached an agreement with Mithridates but it was never accepted by the Senate. Interim peace was never anything more than a gentleman's agreement. Tiring of this political game the ad hoc peace party bypassed the Senate, not only preempting the mandate but also giving to Pompey the power himself to declare it at an end. It ended automatically, however, with the death of Mithridates in 63 BC, the mission being complete.

Florus
Florus writes the briefest of summaries of the Mithridatic War.

Contemporary references

Greek monumental inscriptions
Some monumental inscriptions of the times in Greece shed some light on the Roman command structure during First Mithridatic War.

See also
List of conflicts in the Near East

Notes

Sources

Classical

Further reading
Burcu Erciyas, Deniz. 2005. Wealth, aristocracy and royal propaganda under the Hellenistic kingdom of the Mithridatids in the central Black Sea region of Turkey. Leiden: Brill.
Gabrielsen, Vincent, and John Lund, eds. 2007. The Black Sea in Antiquity: Regional and interregional economic exchanges. Aarhus, Denmark: Aarhus University Press.
McGing, Brian C. 1986. The foreign policy of Mithridates VI Eupator king of Pontos. Leiden: Brill.
Sherwin-White, Adrian N. 1984. Roman foreign policy in the East 168 B.C. to A.D. 1. London: Duckworth.
Sullivan, Richard D. 1990. Near Eastern royalty and Rome: 100–30 B.C. Toronto: University of Toronto Press.

External links

 

 
80s BC conflicts
70s BC conflicts
60s BC conflicts
1st century BC in the Roman Republic
Battles involving Pontus
Wars involving the Roman Republic